The 2014 Saxony state election was held on 31 August 2014 to elect the members of the 6th Landtag of Saxony. The incumbent coalition government of the Christian Democratic Union (CDU) and Free Democratic Party (FDP) led by Minister-President Stanislaw Tillich was defeated as the FDP lost all its seats. The CDU subsequently formed a grand coalition with the Social Democratic Party (SPD), and Tillich was re-elected as Minister-President.

Background
After the 2009 state election, held a month before the 2009 federal election, the CDU–SPD grand coalition left office and was replaced by a CDU-led coalition with the FDP. The FDP suffered a major decline in support nationally after 2009, culminating in their ejection from the Bundestag in the 2013 federal election. Thus, in the lead-up to the 2014 state election, the Saxony state government was the only government nationwide that included the FDP. It seemed unlikely this coalition could continue after the election, as polling indicated the FDP may not even pass the 5% threshold to enter the Landtag.

The largest opposition party was The Left. Polling indicated that a coalition between The Left, the SPD and The Greens may have been able to secure a majority, but this option was rejected by both the SPD and the Greens prior to the election.

For the SPD, the state election in Saxony was their second electoral test (after the European elections) since becoming the junior partner in the federal grand coalition. Polls suggested that the public viewed the SPD's role in government as positive; issues that had been worked on by the government were primarily election promises of the SPD. Despite this, all polls showed that the SPD was headed for another third-place finish in the state election. The SPD's election campaign was centred on their lead candidate, Martin Dulig, who involved his family in the campaign. Dulig was also supported by former federal Chancellor Gerhard Schröder.

The Alternative for Germany (AfD) was hoping to win seats in a state parliament for the first time. In both the 2013 federal election and the 2013 European elections, AfD had achieved its strongest results in Saxony (6.8% in the federal election and 10.1% in the European elections).

The National Democratic Party (NPD) had won seats in Saxony in 2004 and retained them, with losses, in 2009. Polling and election results for the NPD had trended downwards since then, with most polls suggesting the party would not cross the 5% threshold and would thus lose their representation.

The Pirate Party won 1.9% of the vote in the previous state election. Despite polling in late 2011 and 2012 showing its support up to as much as 9% in Saxony, the party lost most of its popularity throughout 2013, and the party had averaged around 2% in Saxony since the end of the year.

Pre-election coalition talks
Polls suggested that the CDU would again be the largest party. Minister-President Tillich was therefore expected to lead coalition negotiations. In addition to the SPD, the Greens hoped for a coalition with the CDU, but a "black-green" coalition was considered unlikely because the Greens oppose coal mining in Saxony.

Prior to the election, Tillich was open to coalitions with the FDP, the SPD, the Greens or AfD. Carsten Linnemann, the chairman of the CDU/CSU Business Association, stated that a coalition with the Greens was a viable alternative if the FDP did not obtain any seats. Tillich did not rule out a coalition with AfD, though CDU general-secretary Peter Tauber spoke out against the possibility.

The Left was unlikely to overtake the CDU, according to polls. The party wanted to form a coalition with the SPD in particular. The SPD, however, were sceptical about such an arrangement.

The NPD was not considered in coalition discussions.

Parties
The table below lists parties represented in the 5th Landtag of Saxony.

Opinion polling

Election result

|-
! colspan="2" | Party
! Votes
! %
! +/-
! Seats 
! +/-
! Seats %
|-
| bgcolor=| 
| align=left | Christian Democratic Union (CDU)
| align=right| 645,515
| align=right| 39.4
| align=right| 0.8
| align=right| 59
| align=right| 1
| align=right| 46.8
|-
| bgcolor=| 
| align=left | The Left (Linke)
| align=right| 309,581
| align=right| 18.9
| align=right| 1.7
| align=right| 27
| align=right| 2
| align=right| 21.4
|-
| bgcolor=| 
| align=left | Social Democratic Party (SPD)
| align=right| 202,396
| align=right| 12.4
| align=right| 2.0
| align=right| 18
| align=right| 4
| align=right| 14.3
|-
| bgcolor=| 
| align=left | Alternative for Germany (AfD)
| align=right| 159,611
| align=right| 9.7
| align=right| New
| align=right| 14
| align=right| New
| align=right| 11.1
|-
| bgcolor=| 
| align=left | Alliance 90/The Greens (Grüne)
| align=right| 93,857
| align=right| 5.7
| align=right| 0.7
| align=right| 8
| align=right| 1
| align=right| 6.4
|-
! colspan=8|
|-
| bgcolor=| 
| align=left | National Democratic Party (NPD)
| align=right| 81,051
| align=right| 4.9
| align=right| 0.7
| align=right| 0
| align=right| 8
| align=right| 0
|-
| bgcolor=| 
| align=left | Free Democratic Party (FDP)
| align=right| 61,840
| align=right| 3.8
| align=right| 6.2
| align=right| 0
| align=right| 14
| align=right| 0
|-
| bgcolor=|
| align=left | Free Voters (FW)
| align=right| 26,434
| align=right| 1.6
| align=right| 0.2
| align=right| 0
| align=right| ±0
| align=right| 0
|-
| bgcolor=| 
| align=left | Human Environment Animal Protection (Tierschutz)
| align=right| 18,611
| align=right| 1.1
| align=right| 1.0
| align=right| 0
| align=right| ±0
| align=right| 0
|-
| bgcolor=| 
| align=left | Pirate Party Germany (Piraten)
| align=right| 18,157
| align=right| 1.1
| align=right| 0.8
| align=right| 0
| align=right| ±0
| align=right| 0
|-
| bgcolor=|
| align=left | Others
| align=right| 20,547
| align=right| 1.3
| align=right| 
| align=right| 0
| align=right| ±0
| align=right| 0
|-
! align=right colspan=2| Total
! align=right| 1,637,499
! align=right| 100.0
! align=right| 
! align=right| 126
! align=right| 6
! align=right| 
|-
! align=right colspan=2| Voter turnout
! align=right| 
! align=right| 49.1
! align=right| 3.1
! align=right| 
! align=right| 
! align=right| 
|}

Government formation
Due to the ejection of the FDP from the Landtag, the CDU was forced to seek new coalition partners. Minister-President Tillich ruled out a coalition with AfD.

The CDU held exploratory talks with the Greens and the SPD. Talks with the Greens were inconclusive; the Greens claimed that education policy and energy policy were the sticking points. Antje Hermenau, the Greens' lead candidate, then resigned on 20 September.

Coalition talks began on 19 September between the CDU and the SPD. On 9 November 2014, the SPD announced that 82.2% of its members had voted in favour of the coalition agreement between the CDU and SPD.

References

2014 elections in Germany
Elections in Saxony
August 2014 events in Germany